Cryptomeria (literally "hidden parts") is a monotypic genus of conifer in the cypress family Cupressaceae, formerly belonging to the family Taxodiaceae. It includes only one species, Cryptomeria japonica (syn. Cupressus japonica L.f.). The tree is called Japanese cedar or Japanese redwood in English. It has been extensively introduced and cultivated for wood production on the Azores.

Description

It is superficially similar to the related giant sequoia (Sequoiadendron giganteum), from which it can be differentiated by the longer leaves (under  in the giant sequoia) and smaller cones ( in the giant sequoia), and the harder bark on the trunk (thick, soft and spongy in giant sequoia).

Endemism
Sugi has been cultivated in China for so long that it is frequently thought to be native there. Forms selected for ornament and timber production long ago in China have been described as a distinct variety Cryptomeria japonica var. sinensis (or even a distinct species, Cryptomeria fortunei), but they do not differ from the full range of variation found in the wild in Japan, and there is no definite evidence the species ever occurred wild in China. Genetic analysis of the most famous Chinese population, on Tianmu Mountain, containing trees estimated to be nearly 1000 years old, supports the hypothesis that the population originates from an introduction.

Outside of its native range, Cryptomeria was also introduced to the Azores in the mid 19th century for wood production. It is currently the most cultivated species in the archipelago, occupying over 12,698 hectares, 60% of the production forest and about 1/5 of the region's total land area.

Biology
Cryptomeria grows in forests on deep, well-drained soils subject to warm, moist conditions, and it is fast-growing under these conditions. It is intolerant of poor soils and cold, drier climates.

It is used as a food plant by the larvae of some moths of the genus Endoclita including E. auratus, E. punctimargo and E. undulifer. Sugi (and hinoki) pollen is a major cause of hay fever in Japan.

Fossil record
The earliest fossil record of Cryptomeria are descriptions based on vegetative organs of †Cryptomeria kamtschatica of the Late Eocene from Kamchatka, Russia and †Cryptomeria protojaponica and †Cryptomeria sichotensis from the Oligocene of Primorye, Russia.
Several fossil leafy shots of †Cryptomeria yunnanensis have been described from Rupelian stage strata of the Lühe Basin in Yunnan, China.

From the Neogene, Cryptomeria is well represented as seed cones, leafy shoots and wood in the fossil records of Europe and Japan. †Cryptomeria rhenana was described from the early Late Miocene to the Late Miocene of Rhein in Morsbach, Germany, from the Early and Middle Pliocene of Northern Italy, to the Middle Pliocene of Dunarobba, Italy and to the Early Pleistocene of Umbria, Italy. † Cryptomeria anglica was described from the Late Miocene of La Cerdana, Spain, to the Late Middle Miocene of Brjánslækur, Iceland and from the Late Miocene to the early Pliocene Brassington Formation of Derbyshire, England. †Cryptomeria miyataensis was described from the Late Miocene of Akita, Japan. Cryptomeria japonica was described from the Late Miocene of Georgia and from the Pliocene of Duab, Abkhazia. It has also been described from the Pliocene of Honshu, Japan, Late Pliocene of Osaka, Japan and from the Pleistocene of Kyushu, Japan.

Cultivation

Timber

Cryptomeria japonica timber is extremely fragrant, weather and insect resistant, soft, and with a low density. The timber is used for the making of staves, tubs, casks, furniture and other indoor applications. Easy to saw and season, it is favoured for light construction, boxes, veneers and plywood. Wood that has been buried turns dark green and is much valued. Resin from the tree contains cryptopimaric and phenolic acid.

The wood is pleasantly scented, reddish-pink in colour, lightweight but strong, waterproof and resistant to decay. It is favoured in Japan for all types of construction work as well as interior panelling, etc. In Darjeeling district and Sikkim in India, where it is one of the most widely growing trees, C. japonica is called Dhuppi and is favoured for its light wood, extensively used in house building.

In Japan, the coppicing method of daisugi is sometimes used to harvest logs.

Mechanical properties
In dry air conditions, the initial density of Japanese cedar timber has been determined to be about 300–420 kg/m3.
It displays a Young's modulus of 8017 MPa, 753 MPa and 275 MPa in the longitudinal, radial and tangential direction in relation to the wood fibers.

Ornamental
Cryptomeria japonica is extensively used in forestry plantations in Japan, China and the Azores islands, and is widely cultivated as an ornamental tree in other temperate areas, including Britain, Europe, North America and eastern Himalaya regions of Nepal and India.

The cultivar 'Elegans' is notable for retaining juvenile foliage throughout its life, instead of developing normal adult foliage when one year old (see the picture with different shoots). There are numerous dwarf cultivars that are widely used in rock gardens and for bonsai, including 'Tansu', 'Koshyi', 'Little Diamond', 'Yokohama' and 'Kilmacurragh.'

The following cultivars have gained the Royal Horticultural Society's Award of Garden Merit (confirmed 2017): 
 C. japonica 'Bandai-sugi' 
 C. japonica 'Elegans Compacta' 
 C. japonica 'Elegans Viridis' 
 C. japonica 'Globosa Nana' 
 C. japonica 'Golden Promise' 
 C. japonica 'Sekkan-sugi' 
 Cryptomeria japonica 'Spiralis'  
 C. japonica 'Vilmoriniana'

Symbolism
Sugi is  commonly planted around temples and shrines, with many hugely impressive trees planted centuries ago. Sargent (1894; The Forest Flora of Japan) recorded the instance of a daimyō (feudal lord) who was too poor to donate a stone lantern at the funeral of the shōgun Tokugawa Ieyasu (1543–1616) at Nikkō Tōshō-gū, but requested instead to be allowed to plant an avenue of sugi, so that "future visitors might be protected from the heat of the sun".

 is a large cryptomeria tree located on Yakushima, a UNESCO World Heritage Site, in Japan. It is the oldest and largest among the old-growth cryptomeria trees on the island, and is estimated to be between 2,170 and 7,200 years old.

Cryptomeria are often described and referred to in Japanese literature. For instance, cryptomeria forests and their workers, located on the mountains north of Kyoto, are featured in Yasunari Kawabata's famous book The Old Capital.

Gallery

See also

 Cedar wood
 Great sugi of Kayano
 Houkisugi at Nakagawa
 Sugi no Osugi
 Jōmon Sugi
 List of superlative trees
 Onbashira
 Magewappa a traditional Japanese wood craft using Cryptomeria

References

 Gymnosperm Database: Cryptomeria

Further reading
 Cryptomeria anglica, Boulter and Chaloner, 1968; a fossil species from Pliocene deposits in Derbyshire, England.

External links

 Cryptomeria japonica, Morton Arboretum acc. 560-82*11 & 12
 USDA Forest Service Fact Sheet ST-219 Japanese Cedar (pdf)
 Conifers Around the World: Cryptomeria japonica - Sugi.

Cupressaceae
Endemic flora of Japan
Trees of Japan
Trees of mild maritime climate
Near threatened plants
Garden plants of Asia
Ornamental trees
Monotypic conifer genera